Cédric Gonçalves (born 6 August 1993) is a French professional footballer who plays as a midfielder for Angoulême.

Club career
Gonçalves made his full professional debut in a 2–1 Ligue 2 defeat against Brest in August 2014, coming on the pitch in the last ten minutes as a substitute for Eugène Ekobo.

References

External links
 
 
 Cédric Gonçalves foot-national.com Profile

Living people
1993 births
People from Beaumont, Puy-de-Dôme
Sportspeople from Puy-de-Dôme
Association football midfielders
French footballers
French people of Portuguese descent
Ligue 2 players
Championnat National 2 players
Championnat National 3 players
Clermont Foot players
AS Saint-Priest players
ÉFC Fréjus Saint-Raphaël players
Angoulême Charente FC players
Footballers from Auvergne-Rhône-Alpes